Metuisela Beitaki (born 16 October 1995) is a Fijian cricketer. He played in the 2015 ICC World Cricket League Division Six tournament.

In August 2018, he played in Fiji's opening fixture of the 2018–19 ICC World Twenty20 East Asia-Pacific Qualifier tournament, against Vanuatu, top-scoring with 52 runs. He was the leading run-scorer for Fiji in the tournament, with 192 runs in six matches.

In July 2022, he was named in Fiji's Twenty20 International (T20I) squad for the 2022 ICC Men's T20 World Cup East Asia-Pacific Qualifier A in Vanuatu. He made his T20I debut on 9 September 2022 against Vanuatu.

References

External links
 

1995 births
Living people
Fijian cricketers
Fiji Twenty20 International cricketers
Place of birth missing (living people)